White Peaks el.  is a small group of mountain peaks in the southern section of the Gallatin Range in Yellowstone National Park.

See also
 Mountains and mountain ranges of Yellowstone National Park

Notes

Mountains of Wyoming
Mountains of Yellowstone National Park
Mountains of Park County, Wyoming